Liashur Sara-ye Sofla (also Romanized as Līāshūr Sarā-ye Soflá) is a village in Lat Leyl Rural District, Otaqvar District, Langarud County, Gilan Province, Iran. At the 2006 census, its population was 72, in 15 families.

References 

Populated places in Langarud County